Kristina Marie Kunkel (born March 27, 1984, in Rancho Santa Margarita, California) is a water polo player from the United States. She was a member of the US Women's Water Polo Team that won the silver medal at the 2005 World Aquatics Championships in Montréal, Canada.

See also
 List of World Aquatics Championships medalists in water polo

References
Profile

1984 births
Living people
American female water polo players
Sportspeople from Orange County, California
World Aquatics Championships medalists in water polo
People from Rancho Santa Margarita, California
UCLA Bruins women's water polo players